Point is a major division/area in St. John's, Antigua and Barbuda.

Major Divisions of Antigua and Barbuda

Demographics 
Point's major division code is 11.

 11000 Central St. (North) 
 11100 Green Bay School
 11200 Green Bay Canal
 11300 Warnford Rd.
 11400 Lower Grey Hill
 11500 Matthew St.
 11600 White Road
 11700 Grays Farm Rd.
 11800 Kentish (North)
 11900 Station Rd. (North)

Notable people 
Gaston Browne (b. 1967) Prime Minister of Antigua and Barbuda (2014-present)

References 

Major Divisions of Antigua and Barbuda
St. John's, Antigua and Barbuda